Steven Weber (born 1961) is an American actor

Steven or Stephen Weber is also the name of:

 Steven Weber (professor), professor at the University of California, Berkeley, studying open source
 Steve Weber, American musician
 Stephen G. Weber, American professor at the University of Pittsburgh

See also 
 Stephen Webber (disambiguation)